Victor Benediktovich Nord-Levin (Hebrew: ויקטור בנדיקטוביץ׳ נורד־לוין, Ukrainian: Ві́ктор Бенеди́ктович Норд-Ле́він, born 1945 in Odessa, Odessa Oblast, Ukrainian Soviet Socialist Republic, Soviet Union) is an Israeli-American independent filmmaker best known for his 1977 Israeli directorial debut The Garden that represented Israel at the 1977 Cannes Film Festival, the 1977 San Francisco International Film Festival, and the 1978 Toronto Waterfront International Film Festival.

Biography

Nord, son of actress Evgeniya Mikhailovna Rostova-Nord née Goldenberg and notable Soviet theatre director and actor , immigrated to Israel from the Soviet Union in April 1973 after graduating with honors in 1971 from |All-Union State Institute of Cinematography] also known as the Moscow Film School]. He started working as assistant on film stages in Moscow while only sixteen and decided to immigrate to Israel after encountering difficulties related to political censorship and antisemitism with directing his first own films in the Soviet Union. Nonetheless, he managed to work briefly as assistant director on Sergei Bondarchuk’s, 1970 film Waterloo, and for one year on Aleksei Yuryevich German’s 1971 film Trial on the Road. Since 1982 he resides in New York, New York. More recently he worked as editor on "The Russians Are Here"Frontline. In 1984 (the show Captive in El Salvador he edited was awarded an Emmy Award); as director of dialogue he worked on The Comrades, 12-episode series (WGBH-TV-Boston). Nord is also the author of nine screenplays (2004–2018) written especially for television series. He is married to Elena S. Nord-Levin née Shevelyov and is father to Benny Nord-Levin (born 2001) and David Nord-Levin (born 2007).

References

External links

1945 births
20th-century American male writers
21st-century American male writers
American experimental filmmakers
American male screenwriters
American television editors
American television writers
Film directors from New York City
Gerasimov Institute of Cinematography alumni
Film people from Odesa
Israeli emigrants to the United States
Israeli experimental filmmakers
Israeli people of Ashkenazi descent
Israeli male screenwriters
Israeli television people
Jewish American screenwriters
Jewish film people
Living people
American male television writers
Łódź Film School alumni
Naturalized citizens of Israel
Odesa Jews
People who emigrated to escape Bolshevism
People with acquired American citizenship
Screenwriters from New York (state)
Secular Jews
Soviet defectors
Soviet emigrants to Israel
Television personalities from New York City
Ukrainian defectors
Ukrainian emigrants to Israel
Writers from New York City
21st-century American Jews